John McClure Hotchner is an American philatelist and philatelic writer. In 2013, he received the Charles J. Peterson Philatelic Literature Life Achievement award. He is a member of the National Postal Museum Council of Philatelists of the Smithsonian National Postal Museum. In 2017 he was appointed to the Roll of Distinguished Philatelists.

He was employed with the United States Department of State for 42 years.

Selected publications
 Facts and Fantasy About Philately. 21st Century Stamp Company, 1992. (Anthology)

References

American philatelists
Fellows of the Royal Philatelic Society London
Living people
Signatories to the Roll of Distinguished Philatelists
Philatelic authors
American civil servants
Year of birth missing (living people)